
Wonderwall may refer to:

 Wonderwall (film), a 1968 psychedelic film by Joe Massot
 Wonderwall Music, the film's soundtrack, and first solo album by George Harrison
 The Wonderwall, an attraction at the 1984 Louisiana World Exposition held in New Orleans
 "Wonderwall" (song), a 1995 release by Oasis, named after Harrison's album
 The Wonderwall, game show bonus round first seen in the 1999 British lottery series Winning Lines
 Wonderwall (band), a 2001 German pop group